Matthew Claude Mills (born 14 July 1986) is an English retired professional footballer who played as a defender. He spent most of his career in the English EFL Championship, in which he played for Leicester City, Reading, Bolton, Nottingham Forest, Doncaster Rovers and Barnsley. He retired from professional football in 2020.

Born in Swindon, Mills started his youth career with the academy of Swindon Town before switching to the Southampton Academy in 1999. He turned professional in 2002 and had loan stints with Coventry City and AFC Bournemouth during his time with Southampton. In 2006, Mills signed with Manchester City. However, his playing time was limited due to injuries.

After loan deals with Colchester United and Doncaster Rovers, he signed permanently with the latter in 2008. After one season, Mills joined Reading for a fee believed to be around £2 million. In May 2011, he captained the club in the Championship play-off final defeat against Swansea City, where he also found the net. After rejecting an offer from Wolverhampton Wanderers, Mills signed with Leicester City in the same year and was appointed as the club captain. In 2012, he switched to Bolton Wanderers. Mills finished third in voting for the club's player of the 2014–15 season. He switched to rival Nottingham Forest in 2015. After having spent three seasons with Forest, he joined Barnsley, Pune City and Forest Green Rovers before announcing his retirement from professional football.

Mills has been capped at the national youth level and featured eight times for the England under-19. His younger brother Joseph Mills plays for Forest Green Rovers. In February 2009, football pundit and former Leicester City player Steve Claridge described Mills' style of play as that of "an old-fashioned centre-half who relishes the physical side of the game".

Club career

Southampton
Born in Swindon, Wiltshire, Mills started his youth career at Swindon Town in 1999 before joining Southampton at the age of fourteen. Having progressed through the Southampton Academy, and then the reserves, Mills signed his first professional contract with the club in 2002.

To gain first team experience, Mills was loaned out to Coventry City for one month on 18 September 2004. On the same day, he made his Coventry City debut, just hours after signing the paperwork for him to play later in the afternoon, in a 0–0 draw against Rotherham United. Mills made three more starts, including scoring an own goal, in a 2–1 loss against Ipswich Town on 3 October 2004, in what turned out to be his last appearance. Mills then returned to his parent club and made four appearances. Coventry City sought to extend his loan period for a second month, but Southampton turned them down.

On 21 February 2005, Mills was loaned out again for a month joining AFC Bournemouth. The following day, he made his Bournemouth debut the next day, making his first start and playing 90 minutes, in a 1–1 draw against Torquay United. This was followed up by scoring his first goals, coming against Tranmere Rovers and Swindon Town. His performance and form at the club led them to extend his loan twice, eventually lasting to the end of the 2004–05 season. In the last game of the season, he scored his third goal for the club, in a 4–2 loss against Bradford City. At the end of the 2004–05 season, Mills made twelve appearances and scored three times in all competitions.

After his loan spell at Bournemouth came to an end, Mills was among many youngsters to be in the first team squad ahead of the 2005–06 season. However, Mills remained out of the first team for almost half of the season until he finally made his Southampton debut, where he made his first start, in a 3–0 loss against Watford on 26 December 2005. After making three more appearances, Mills' future at Southampton was in doubt, as his contract was set to expire in the summer attracting interest from Manchester City.

Manchester City
Mills ultimately signed a three-and-a-half-year deal with Manchester City on 31 January 2006. There he linked up again with Manchester City's reserve manager Steve Wigley, who had worked with him during his spell in charge of Southampton's Academy, an opportunity Mills said he could not turn down.

Mills was immediately assigned to the club's reserves. However, while playing in the reserves, he suffered an ankle injury that saw him sidelined for weeks. Mills made his Manchester City debut, where he came on as a substitute for Danny Mills in the 84th minute, in a 2–0 loss against Chelsea on 25 March 2006. Two weeks later on 8 April 2006, Mills made his first starts for the club, playing in the right–back position, in a 2–1 loss against Tottenham Hotspur. At the end of the 2005–06 season, he went on to make two appearances for Manchester City.

At the start of the 2006–07 season, Mills suffered an ankle injury but then recovered and made his first appearance of the season, in a 4–0 win over Wigan Athletic on 21 October 2006. However, his first team opportunities was limited and was loaned out to Colchester United on a one–month loan on 26 January 2007. He made his debut for the club on 30 January 2007, starting the whole game and keeping a clean sheet, in a 1–0 win over Preston North End. His performance and form at Colchester United led them to extend his loan spell for twice, resulting in him making nine appearances. Mills returned to his parent club on 23 March 2007 after they recalled him.

Doncaster Rovers
On 17 August 2007, Mills joined Doncaster Rovers on a six-month loan deal, linking up with manager Sean O'Driscoll for the second time in his career. He made his debut for the club on 25 August 2007, where he came on as a substitute in the 83rd minute for Gareth Roberts, in a 2–1 loss against Bournemouth. Mills then scored two goals in two matches for Doncaster Rovers between 29 September 2007 and 2 October 2007 against Cheltenham Town and Walsall. Since joining the club, he quickly became a first team regular for the side for the next seventeen matches, helping Doncaster Rovers keep a total of five clean sheets. On 21 November 2007, Mills had his loan spell at Doncaster Rovers terminated and returned to his parent club after he sustained a knee injury.

It was then announced on 14 January 2008 that Mills joined the South Yorkshire club for the second time on a loan deal for the rest of the season. He was part of the starting eleven once again, playing in the centre–back position. Mills helped Doncaster Rovers keep four consecutive clean sheets between 29 January 2008 and 12 February 2008. However, in a match against Huddersfield Town on 5 April 2008, he received a straight red card, as the club drew 2–2. After returning to the starting line–up against Leyton Orient, Mills scored his third goal for Doncaster Rovers in a follow–up match, as the club beat Luton Town on 26 April 2008. He then helped Doncaster Rovers win promotion to the Championship, beating Leeds United at Wembley Stadium in the League One play-off final on 25 May 2008. At the end of the 2007–08 season, Mills went on to make forty–one appearances and scoring three times in all competitions.

Mills expressed a desire to join Doncaster Rovers after winning promotion at Wembley, and was expected to sign in the close season. After two months of speculation about his future, and his move to Doncaster Rovers was in doubt after a change of manager at Manchester City, he was eventually unveiled as Doncaster Rovers' record signing when he inked a three-year contract with Doncaster on 30 July 2008. Doncaster Rovers paid £300,000 for his services (the then highest transfer fee paid by the club).

Mills' first game after signing for Doncaster Rovers on a permanent basis came in the opening game of the season against Derby County and kept a clean sheet, in a 1–0 win. Following the match, he was named Championship Team of the Week. In a follow–up match against Cardiff City, Mills set up the opening goal of the game, as the club drew 1–1. Since joining Doncaster Rovers, he continued to regain his first team place, playing in the centre–back position. Mills then helped the club keep three consecutive clean sheets between 15 November 2008 and 25 November 2008. However, he was sent–off for a straight red card in the 20th minute, in a 2–1 loss against Crystal Palace on 13 December 2008. After serving a one match suspension, Mills returned to the starting line–up against Nottingham Forest on 26 December 2008, as Doncaster Rovers won 4–2. He, once again, helped the club keep three consecutive clean sheets between 20 January 2009 and 27 January 2009. Despite missing five matches, Mills finished his first full season at Doncaster Rovers, making 45 appearances in the 2008–09 season. For his performance, he was named the club's Player of the Year.

In the summer of 2009, Mills attracted the interest of a number of bigger clubs including Birmingham City and Newcastle United. However, on 10 June 2009 Nottingham Forest put in an offer of £2,000,000 for Mills which was rejected by Doncaster Rovers. A later offer from fellow Championship side Reading was accepted, however, and Mills left Doncaster in August 2009.

Reading
On 5 August 2009, Mills was officially unveiled as a Reading player, signing a three-year contract under manager Brendan Rodgers. The exact transfer fee was undisclosed, however it is believed to be somewhere in the region of £2 million.

Mills made his debut for Reading debut, starting the whole game, in a 5–1 win against Burton Albion in the first round of the League Cup. In a follow–up, he made his league debut for the club, starting the whole game, and keeping a clean sheet, in a 0–0 draw against Swansea City on 18 August 2009. Four days later on 22 August 2009, Mills scored his first goal for Reading, in a 3–1 loss against Sheffield United. However, Mills found his first team opportunities limited and was placed on the substitute bench, and for tactical reasons, according to Managers Rodgers. He also found his own injury concern along the way. Nevertheless, Mills' second goal came on 17 October 2009, in a 3–1 loss against West Brom. By January, he soon regained his first team place, dispatching a place from Alex Pearce and Darren O'Dea. Mills' performance was then praised after showing impressive display after helping the club beat Liverpool in the third round replay of the FA Cup on 13 January 2010. However against his former club, Doncaster Rovers on 7 February 2010, he was sent–off in the 80th minute for handball, resulting a penalty to the opposition team, as Reading won 2–1. After serving a one match suspension, Mills returned to the starting line–up against Crystal Palace on 17 February 2010, where he captained the club in the absence of Ívar Ingimarsson, as they won 3–1. Mills captained in a follow–up match against Blackpool, as Reading lost 2–0. After Reading's 1–0 win in March 2010 against Queens Park Rangers, Mills was seen making an apparent obscene gesture to his own supporters, for which he apologised. Manager Brian McDermott attributed his gesturing to passion, saying that Mills' actions would not dampen the player's relationship with his supporters—describing Mills' form as "inspirational". However, he was sent–off for the second time this season, coming against Ipswich Town on 3 April 2010 after a two footed challenge in the 30th minute, as the club lost 2–1. After serving a four match ban, Mills returned to the starting line–up and resumed his captaincy against Watford, as Reading lost 4–0 on 24 April 2010. In the absence of Ingimarsson, he captained the club in the remaining matches of the season. Mills appeared in 30 matches and scored two goals in all competitions for Reading during the 2009–10 season.

Ahead of the 2010–11 season, Mills announced his intention that he would be focusing on his fitness instead of being Reading captain. However, Mills eventually continued to remain as the club's captain in the absence of Ingimarsson. During a 2–1 loss against Scunthorpe United in the opening game of the season, he suffered an ankle injury that saw him miss one match. After returning to the starting line–up against Nottingham Forest on 21 August 2010, Mills scored twice in the League Cup 2nd Round 3–3 draw against Northampton Town. This was followed up by scoring the winner in a 2–1 win away at Leicester City just three days later where he also made a last-ditch goal line clearance, ensuring the Man of the Match award. Since returning from ankle injury, he continued to be in a first team regular, playing in the centre–back position for the side throughout the 2010–11 season. Mills was then sent–off for a second bookable offence, in a 1–0 win against Ipswich Town on 28 September 2010. On 30 October 2010, he scored his fourth goal of the season, coming against his former club, Doncaster Rovers, in a 4–3 win. It wasn't until on 1 March 2011 when Mills scored the winning goal against Everton in a 1–0 victory to take Reading through to the FA Cup Quarter-finals. In a follow–up match against Ispwich Town, he suffered a groin injury in the 16th minute and was substituted, as the club won 3–1. Following the match, it was announced that Mills was out for a month. He previously was sidelined on two occasions prior to suffering a groin injury. It wasn't until on 12 April 2011 when Mills returned to the starting line–up against Scunthorpe United and helped Reading keep a clean sheet, winning 2–0. Following his return, he helped the club go on a surging run, resulting in them qualifying for the playoffs. Mills played in both legs of the play–offs against Cardiff City, as Reading won 3–0 to reach the finals. On 30 May 2011, in the Championship play-off final against Swansea City, he captained the Royals and scored a header from a corner kick on 57 minutes and got booked in their 4–2 defeat at Wembley Stadium. Mills went on to make forty–five appearances and scoring six times in all competitions in the 2010–11 season.

Ahead of the 2011–12 season, it was expected that Mills was becoming Reading captain. However, he was linked a move away from the club, with Bolton Wanderers, Stoke City and Wolverhampton Wanderers wanted to sign him. But Mills was keen on staying at the club. On 1 July 2011, however, it was expected that he would be leaving Reading after both parties failed to agree on a new contract.

Leicester City

On 7 July 2011, Mills signed a four-year contract with Leicester City which would earn him £25,000 every week (£1.3m/year) for an undisclosed fee and was later confirmed as club captain for the 2011–12 season, reuniting with his former Manchester City manager, Sven-Göran Eriksson. He had rejected an offer from Premier League club Wolverhampton Wanderers to join Leicester. Describing him as a "solid centre half," Ian Stringer of BBC Radio Leicester selected him as the club's key player for the 2011–12 season.

Mills made his league debut for Leicester City, captaining the side, as they won 1–0 over Coventry City at the Ricoh Arena on 6 August 2011. He since captained the club in a number of matches, as well as, establishing himself in the starting eleven. Mills then helped Leicester City keep four consecutive clean sheets between 17 September 2011 and 1 October 2011. In a follow–up match on 16 October 2011, however, he was sent off in the 55th minute of a 2–0 defeat at Birmingham City for a two-footed tackle on Morgaro Gomis. After serving a three match ban, Mills returned to the starting line–up against Burnley, as the club won 3–1 on 1 November 2011. Six weeks after his first red card for Leicester City, he was sent–off for the second time for a professional foul on Aaron McLean, in a 2–1 loss against Hull City on 3 December 2011. After serving a two match suspension, Mills returned to the starting line–up against Ipswich Town on 26 December 2011, as the club drew 2–2. He scored his only goal for Leicester City in a 2–0 win over Southampton at St Mary's Stadium on 24 January 2012.

In February 2012, reports surfaced of an alleged bust up with new manager Nigel Pearson, which Mills denied. He then lost the captaincy and was relegated to training with the club's youth academy. He did not travel for the 1–0 victory against Derby County on 23 February 2012, which prompted questions over his future at the club. Mills was later informed by phone that he was allowed to leave Leicester. But, despite being linked with league rivals Leeds United and West Ham United, Mills refused to leave on loan as it would have been "very disrespectful for the fans". Though this move away from the club did not materialise, he never played for Leicester again and went on to score once in thirty–one appearances in all competitions.

Bolton Wanderers
On 4 July 2012, Mills signed a three-year contract with Bolton Wanderers for an undisclosed fee. On joining the club, he said: "This deal has worked out perfectly for me, mainly because Bolton are a fantastic club. Speaking to the manager, I have got the vibe of what the place and club is about and the ambitions of getting back into the Premier League." Upon joining Bolton Wanderers, Mills was given the number four shirt for the new 2012–13 season,

Mills made his debut for the club in a 2–0 home victory over Derby County on 21 August. He scored his first goal on 15 September, in a 2–1 win against Watford. Since joining Bolton Wanderers, Mills quickly became a first team regular, playing in the centre–back position. However, he picked up an upper thigh injury and was substituted in the 85th minute, as the club drew 2–2 against Huddersfield Town on 8 December 2012. Initially out for two to three weeks, Mills was sidelined for four to five months. It wasn't until on 2 April 2013 when he made his first appearance for the club, coming on as a 90th-minute substitute for goal scorer Chris Eagles to ensure a 1–0 victory against Huddersfield Town. Following his return, Mills, however, was unable to reclaim his starting position due to the form of Craig Dawson, Tim Ream and Zat Knight who had each occupied the centre-back position in his absence. At the end of the 2012–13 season, he went on to make twenty–one appearances and scoring once in all competitions.

In July 2013, after Mills was linked with a move to Leeds United to reunite with his former Reading manager Brian McDermott, Bolton manager Dougie Freedman confirmed that Leeds had made an inquiry about Mills' availability. Freedman stated that he would like Mills to stay at the club, but if Mills wanted to leave he would let him go provided the right offer came in.

At the start of the 2013–14 season, Mills made his return to the first team in the second round of League Cup against Tranmere Rovers and was one of the two players to convert the penalty successfully, as Bolton Wanderers lost 4–2 in the penalty shoot-out after playing 120 minutes. Since making his return to the first team, Mills won his place back in the side and partnered either David Wheater and Tim Ream. His pairing in the central defence with Ream and Wheater was praised by Manager Freedman. During a 3–2 loss against Wigan Athletic on 15 December 2013, he was penalised for handball that saw the opposition team successfully converted the penalty. After the match, Manager Freedman criticised the referee over the handball decision, while Mills was critical of the decision, saying: "The ball came over my head and I'm facing my own goal, I got a push in my back and the referee gave a corner. All of a sudden I see he has given a penalty because the linesman on the other side of the pitch has seen the ball intentionally hit my hand. I haven't got eyes in the back of my head but how does he change his mind? I'm gutted for the fans, obviously." It wasn't until on 11 January 2014 when he scored his first goal for the club, in a 1–1 draw against Nottingham Forest. However, Mills was sidelined when he suffered a minor knee problem during a match against Watford on 22 February 2014. After being sidelined for a month, Mills made his first team return, where he assisted Jermaine Beckford to score the only goal in the game, in a 1–0 win over Barnsley on 12 April 2014. He later finished the 2013–14 season, making 35 appearances and scoring once in all competitions.

Ahead of the 2014–15 season, Mills was named as Bolton Wanderers' vice-captain to Jay Spearing. He continued to establish himself in the starting line–up, forming a centre–back partnership with Ream and Dorian Dervite. Mills scored his first goal of the season on 23 August 2014, in a 2–1 loss against Brighton & Hove Albion. Three days later on 26 August 2014, he captained the club for the first time this season, starting the whole game, and helped the side play 120 minutes, as they won 3–2. Once again, Mills captained Bolton Wanderers for the second time against Chelsea in the second round of the League Cup and scored his second goal of the season, in a 2–1 loss. He then scored the only goal in the game, in a 1–0 win over Birmingham City on 18 October 2014. In the absence of Spearing following his injury, Mills played his first match as captain in the league and scored in a 3–0 win over Cardiff City on 4 November 2014. Following this, he was given the captaincy for the next two months, as the club have been battling in the relegation zone. During which, Mills helped Bolton Wanderers keep four consecutive clean sheets between 29 November 2014 and 19 December 2014. It wasn't until on 27 January 2015 when he scored and set up a goal for Liam Trotter, in a 4–2 loss against Rotherham United. A week later on 4 February 2015, Mills played as a striker following the club's emergency crisis against Liverpool, as they lost 2–1. However, he suffered an injury that saw him sidelined for weeks. It wasn't until on 21 February 2015 when Mills returned to the starting line–up against Nottingham Forest, only to be sent–off for a second bookable offence, in a 4–1 loss and served a one match suspension. Following his return, he continued captaining Bolton Wanderers for nine matches. However, Mills suffered two separate injuries that saw him sidelined for the rest of the 2014–15 season. Mills finished the 2014–15 season, making forty–one appearances and scoring five times in all competitions.

Following this, he finished third with 17 percent behind Josh Vela and Ream in voting for Bolton's Player of the Season. Despite being offered a new contract by Manager Neil Lennon, Mills, however, were among thirteen players to be released by the club in May 2015. His release was explained as part of the club's cut costing measures.

Nottingham Forest
On 1 July 2015, Mills signed for Nottingham Forest as a free agent, re-uniting with former Bolton manager Dougie Freedman in the process. On joining the club, he was given the number five shirt ahead of the new season.

Mills made his Nottingham Forest debut in the opening game of the season, in a 1–0 loss against Brighton & Hove Albion. He then captained his first match as the club's player, following Henri Lansbury's injury, on 29 August 2015, in a 2–1 loss against Cardiff City. Following his debut, Mills started each of Nottingham Forest's first eight matches of the season, scoring twice, before an injury sustained shortly after equalizing against Middlesbrough on 19 September 2015, forcing him to miss the club's next away match Huddersfield Town. He returned to the starting eleven in Nottingham Forest's next game at home to Hull City on 3 October 2015, but received a straight red card from referee Nigel Miller in the 87th minute of the game following an aerial challenge with Hull's on-loan Arsenal striker Chuba Akpom, as the club lost the game 1–0. After serving a three match suspension, he returned to the starting line–up as captain against Sheffield Wednesday on 31 October 2015, as Nottingham Forest lost 1–0. Since returning to the first team, Mills regained his first team place, playing in the centre–back position and resumed his captain duties in the absence of Chris Cohen and Andy Reid. On 5 December 2015, he scored twice in a 3–0 defeat of Fulham, with a third headed effort in injury time hitting the crossbar. Following his performance, Mills was named Team of the Week. Having played an integral role in an unbeaten December for the club, he was nominated for the SkyBet Championship Player of the Month Award on 7 January 2016, but lost out to Adam Clayton. Five days later on 12 January 2016, just after the announcement, he scored his fifth goal of the season, in a 1–1 draw against Birmingham City. Mills followed up with the next four matches by helping the club keep four consecutive clean sheets between 16 January 2016 and 6 February 2016. In his first season at Nottingham Forest, he made forty-two appearances and scoring five times in all competitions.

Mills made his first appearance of the 2016–17 season in Forest's opening match—a 4–3 defeat of Burton Albion under the new management of Philippe Montanier. He continued to regain his first team place, playing in the centre–back position. It wasn't until on 14 September 2016 when Mills scored his first goal of the season in a 2–2 draw against Rotherham United. One month later, he was red-carded in a 3–1 defeat against Newcastle United. Manager Montanier said that the fourth official had exaggerated the decision. After the match, Mills served a one match suspension. Mills was previously sidelined due to injury, suspension and tactical change earlier in the 2016–17 season. After the departure of Montanier, and the sale of regular captain Henri Lansbury, Mills was installed as captain by caretaker manager Gary Brazil, having previously captained six out of the seven last matches for Nottingham Forest. However, he only lasted fifty-five minutes in Brazil's first game, being substituted after a groin injury that was later reported would sideline him for two months. It wasn't until on 4 April 2017 when Mills returned to the starting line–up against Wolverhampton Wanderers, starting the whole game, in a 1–0 loss. However, his return was short–lived when he suffered a knock during a match against Blackburn Rovers on 14 April 2017 and was substituted as a result and missed two matches as a result. It wasn't until on 29 April 2017 when Mills returned to the starting line–up against Queens Park Rangers, coming on as a 62nd-minute substitute, as the club lost 2–0. At the end of the 2016–17 season, he went on to make thirty appearances and scoring once in all competitions.

At the start of the 2017–18 season, Mills continued to regain his first team place for the side, playing in the centre–back position. Following the absent of Michael Mancienne, he captained Nottingham Forest for the first time in the 2017–18 season, starting the whole game, in a 2–1 win against Middlesbrough on 19 August 2017. Mills went on to captain five matches for the club in the next six matches. This lasted until he was sidelined for one match, due to suspension. After serving a one match suspension, Mills found himself out of the starting line–up for the next two months, being placed on the substitute bench and only made one appearances between those time. It wasn't until on 9 December 2017 when he made his first start for Nottingham Forest, starting the whole game, in a 3–2 win against Bolton Wanderers. However, his return was short–lived when Mills suffered a back injury that saw him substituted at half time, in a 2–1 loss against Bristol City on 16 December 2017. It wasn't until on 7 January 2018 when he returned to the first team from injury, coming on as a late substitute, in a 4–2 win against Arsenal in the third round of the FA Cup. However, Mills was told by new Manager Aitor Karanka that he can leave Nottingham Forest after being deemed surplus of requirements. On 31 January 2018, Mills terminated his contract with the club by mutual agreement. By the time he left Nottingham Forest, he went on to make fifteen appearances in all competitions.

Barnsley
On 31 January 2018, Mills signed with Barnsley for the remainder of the season.

Three days later, he made his debut for the club, starting the whole game, in a 1–0 defeat against Queens Park Rangers. After making two more starts for Barnsley, Mills, however, was sidelined for a month with ankle injury. It wasn't until on 21 April 2018 when he returned to the starting line–up against Leeds United, as the club lost 2–1. Following this, Mills was involved in Barnsley's first team, as they were relegated from the EFL Championship.

At the end of the 2017–18 season, he went on to make four appearances for the side. Following this, Mills was released by Barnsley at the end of the 2017–18 season.

Pune City
On 21 August 2018, Mills joined Indian Super League club Pune City.

He made his debut for the club, starting the whole game, in a 1–1 draw against Delhi Dynamos in the opening game of the season. It wasn't until on 21 November 2018 when he scored his first goal for the club, in a 2–1 win against Jamshedpur. Mills then captained twice for Pune City, coming against Kerala Blasters and Goa on 7 December 2018 and 11 December 2018. However, he suffered a calf injury that saw him out for weeks. It wasn't until on 20 February 2019 when Mills returned to the first team, coming on as a 61st-minute substitute, in a 1–1 draw against NorthEast United. Having established himself in the centre–back position, he went on to make seventeen appearances in all competitions.

Forest Green Rovers
On 31 May 2019, League Two club Forest Green Rovers announced that they had signed Mills as a player-coach in advance of the 2019–20 season. Upon joining the club, he was able to link up with his younger brother, Joseph and was given a number shirt.

Mills made his Forest Green Rovers debut, starting the whole game, and helped the club keep a clean sheet, in a 1–0 win against Oldham Athletic in the opening game of the season. He then started in the next five matches for Forest Green Rovers before being sent–off for a second bookable offence against Bradford City on 24 August 2019 and then suffered a hamstring injury during a 2–0 loss against Newport County on 31 August 2019. After being sidelined for weeks, it wasn't until on 28 September 2019 when Mills returned to the starting line–up against Salford City and kept a clean sheet, as the club won 4–0. However, his return was short–lived when he suffered a hamstring injury in the 10th minute and was substituted, as Forest Green Rovers won 3–1 against Crawley Town on 5 October 2019. It wasn't until on 12 November 2019 when Mills returned to the starting line–up against Walsall, captaining the club, as they lost 6–0. Following this, he regained his first team place, playing in the centre–back position. However, Mills soon lost his first team place and was demoted to the substitute bench. This lasted until the season came to a premature end due to the global pandemic COVID-19. At the end of the 2019–20 season, he went on to make twenty–one appearances in all competitions.

Following this, Mills was released by Forest Green Rovers when his contract expired. He then announced his retirement from playing professional football in July 2020.

International career
Mills was called–up by the England under-19 level and helped the side qualify for the European Under-19 Championship in March 2005. Mills helped the national side to the final, which they lost to the France under-19s. He made a total of eight appearances for the team between 2004 and 2005.

Career statistics

Personal life
Born in Swindon, England, Mills and his family lived just 10 minutes from the town's County Ground until he left when he was 14. He was educated at Bradon Forest Secondary School in Purton, near Swindon.

Mills' youngest brother, Joseph, was a trainee at Southampton. He now plays for Forest Green Rovers, where he was joined by Matt in May 2019. His other brothers, Jon-Paul and Jamie both play for Hellenic Football League side Witney United.

The former Hollyoaks and Prisoners' Wives actress Emma Rigby was formerly Mills' girlfriend. In 2014, he married Jade Elliott, daughter of former Leicester City and Scotland defender Matt Elliott, and together they have two daughters, Lyla and Aria.

Honours
Doncaster Rovers
Football League One play-offs: 2008

Individual
Doncaster Rovers Player of the Year 2008–09

References

External links

Matthew Mills profile at Reading F.C.

1986 births
Living people
Sportspeople from Swindon
English footballers
England youth international footballers
Association football defenders
Southampton F.C. players
Coventry City F.C. players
AFC Bournemouth players
Manchester City F.C. players
Colchester United F.C. players
Doncaster Rovers F.C. players
Reading F.C. players
Leicester City F.C. players
Bolton Wanderers F.C. players
Nottingham Forest F.C. players
Barnsley F.C. players
Forest Green Rovers F.C. players
English Football League players
Indian Super League players
FC Pune City players
Association football coaches
Forest Green Rovers F.C. non-playing staff
English expatriate footballers
Expatriate footballers in India
English expatriate sportspeople in India